Deveronvale Football Club are a senior association football club currently playing the Highland Football League in Scotland. They were founded in 1938 and play their football at the Princess Royal Park in the town of Banff, (formerly Banffshire, now officially Aberdeenshire), Scotland.

The club was formed in 1938 when Deveron Valley and Banff Rovers joined together. The name comes from the River Deveron, which has its mouth at Banff.

After they were formed, it took them one year to get into the Highland League. In August 1939, Deveronvale played their first league game. Their first win came a month later. In 1948 Deveronvale signed James ‘Jimmy’ Williamson from Dunipace Juniors, Jimmy would go on to play for Deveronvale for 7 years and in the process set the record for highest number of individual goals in the Highland League at 197 goals. The crest of Deveronvale FC was designed during the early 1970s by local school teacher, Mr. Chris Murray. He chose a 'heraldic' seagull to represent the twin fishing towns of Banff and Macduff.

In 2003 the Vale won the Highland League title for the first time in their history and repeated this feat once more three years later.

Due to them being a senior team, they can play in the Scottish Cup. In the 2006–07 season, Deveronvale made it into the fourth round of the Scottish Cup after a 5–4 defeat of Third Division side Elgin City, before going out at home to First Division side Partick Thistle.

In the 2011–12 season, Deveronvale entered the Scottish Challenge Cup for the first time.

The club celebrated its 80th anniversary in the 2018-19 season.

Club officials

Technical Staff

 Manager: Craig Stewart
 First-team coach: Grant Noble
 Goalkeeping coach: Mikey Grant
 Assistant coach: Pat McPherson
 Head of Youth Development: Kevin Stewart
 Sports therapist: Andrea McIntosh
 Sports therapist: Rachel Mair
 Kit Man: Lenny Binnie

Club Management
 Chairman: Jim Mair
 Board of Directors:
 Peter Bruce
 Mark Watson
 Amanda Allan
 Executive Secretary: Stewart McPherson

Hall of Fame
The club launched a Hall of Fame as part of the club's 80th anniversary celebrations in 2019, with the following inductees honoured:

 Eddie Bruce
 Stewart McPherson
 Jim Leighton

The intention is that one or more inductees will be considered every year.

Honours
 Highland Football League: 2002–03, 2005–06
 Aberdeenshire Cup: 1947–48, 1950–51, 1951–52, 1961–62, 1965–66, 2000–01, 2006–07, 2011–12
 Aberdeenshire Shield: 1994–95, 2002–03
 Scottish Qualifying Cup (North): 1951–52, 2001–02
 Bells Cup (East): 1977–78

References

External links
 Official website

 
Football clubs in Scotland
Highland Football League teams
Association football clubs established in 1938
1938 establishments in Scotland
Football in Aberdeenshire